Sabana Larga, Elías Piña is a Dominican municipal district of Comendador in the Elías Piña province.

Population

In the last national census (2002), the population of Sabana Larga is included with that of Comendador.

History
Sabana Larga was elevated to the category of municipal district of Comendador by the law 18 of 20 January 2004.

Economy
The main economic activity of the municipality is agriculture.

References

Populated places in Elías Piña Province
Municipalities of the Dominican Republic